Paul Pewitt High School is a public high school in Omaha, Texas, United States. It is part of the Pewitt Consolidated Independent School District and classified as a 3A school by the University Interscholastic League. In 2015, the school was rated "Met Standard" by the Texas Education Agency.

Athletics
The Paul Pewitt Brahmas compete in these sports - 

Volleyball, Cross Country, Football, Basketball, Golf, Tennis, Track, Baseball & Softball

State titles
Football
1998(2A/D1)

State finalist
Football
2019(3A/D2), 2005(2A/D1), 1993(2A/D1)

Theater
One Act Play 
2003(2A)
1982 (3A)

References

External links
 

Public high schools in Texas
Education in Morris County, Texas